Melaporphyria immortua, the dark-banded flower gem, is a moth of the family Noctuidae. The species was first described by Augustus Radcliffe Grote in 1874. It is found in North America from New England west to Colorado, north to southern Manitoba, central Saskatchewan and Alberta.

Adults are on wing from May to June.

The larval host plants are unknown, although there are some records of unknown origin that it feeds on lupine. Reports on Thalictrum species probably refer to nectaring.

References

"Species Profile for Dark-banded Flower Gem (Melaporphyria immortua)". NatureServe. Archived July 21, 2011.

Heliothinae
Moths of North America